Mario Paciolla, born Mario Carmine Paciolla (Naples - March 28, 1987 – San Vicente del Caguán - July 15, 2020), was an Italian journalist, activist and volunteer, who died in strange circumstances during the exercise of his duties with the United Nations Volunteers.

Career 
Paciolla graduated with a degree in political science from the Università degli Studi di Napoli "L'Orientale" in 2014. He moved to Colombia in 2016. For two years Paciolla worked as a volunteer in the Peace Brigades International, a Canadian non-governmental organization for the protection of human rights. In 2018, Mario joined the United Nations Volunteers in its collaboration with the United Nations Mission to verify established peace agreements between the government of Colombia and the Revolutionary Armed Forces of Colombia. On July 15, 2020, he was found lifeless in his home in San Vicente del Caguán.

The reason for his death was unclear. Found hanged with a sheet, the death was initially classified as suicide. Following a general outcry and discovery of new evidence, the Colombian authorities began an investigation of four policemen accused of having allowed United Nations officials to take personal belongings of the victim. The prosecutor's office of Rome also opened an investigation to clarify the cause of death of the Italian activist. The Paciolla family is represented by Alessandra Ballerini, who was a lawyer in the case of the murder of Giulio Regeni.

References

External links
 

1987 births
2020 deaths
People from Naples
Italian activists
Italian journalists